Schuhmann is a surname. Notable people with the surname include:

 Carl Schuhmann (1869-1946), German athlete
 Heiner Schuhmann (born 1948), German footballer
 Winfried Otto Schumann (1888-1974), German physicist 
 Emil Schuhmann German accordionist

Surnames